The Kunstwanderweg Hoher Fläming (Upper Fläming sculpture walk) is a collection of sculpture walks in the Upper Fläming natural park in Brandenburg, Germany, about , or an hour's train ride south of Berlin located between the railway stations at Bad Belzig and Wiesenburg/Mark. The , so-called north route was opened on 5 August 2007. The  so-called south route was opened on 8 May 2010. There are plans for a variety of connecting paths. The "Naturparkverein Fläming e.V." association planned and implemented both routes. The projects were financed via the European Community LEADER programme.

The north route 
Ten works of art relating to the landscape have been installed along the north route. These were chosen from 114 submissions to a German federal competition by a jury chaired by Prof. Rolf Kuhn, the general manager of the Internationale Bauausstellung Fürst-Pückler-Land. An Internationale Bauausstellung (IBA) or Internationale architecture exhibition is a German political instrument for urban engineering and architecture, to show new concepts in terms of social, cultural and ecological ideas.

The south route 
The competition for the south route started in January 2009. Ist subject was the Setzling of the Fläming region by the Flemish people, 850 years ago. The competition was announced both in Flanders and in Fläming. In a two-stage selection process, six works of art were chosen from Flanders and six from Fläming by a jury chaired by Prof. Rolf Kuhn.

Artists from Flanders

Artists from Fläming

The county of art - Upper Fläming 
Artistic work in Upper Fläming is presented under the title of "The county of art - Upper Fläming". A project group working under the aegis of the Naturparkverein Fläming e.V. conceives artistic projects in Upper Fläming and implements them. In 2006, their first project was "Traces of art" ("Kunstspur"), a  walking route, presenting works of art produced by local artists. Following the implementation of the north route of the sculpture walk in 2007 and the south route in 2010, more projects are being planned.

References 
The information in this article is based on that in its German equivalent.

External links 

kunst land hoher fläming 
The LEADER scheme.

Sculpture gardens, trails and parks in Germany
Outdoor sculptures in Germany